Oliver Maltman is an English actor notable for his appearances in the TV series Star Stories, The Kevin Bishop Show, No Heroics and Clone. He has also appeared in Mike Leigh's films Happy-Go-Lucky in 2008, Another Year in 2010, the 2016 BBC Two comedy pilot We the Jury as Lucas, and the 2017 film The Mercy.

Maltman trained at the Central School of Speech and Drama.

Filmography

Film

Television

External links

Living people
1976 births
20th-century English male actors
21st-century English male actors
English male film actors
English male television actors
Male actors from London